Kirveskoski (officially Pornainen or Pornainen church village) is a village of about 2000 inhabitants in Pornainen, Uusimaa, Finland, and the administrative center of the municipality. Next to the church village is the River Mustijoki (Karjakoski by the village), which runs south to Porvoo and from there to the Gulf of Finland. 

It is 20 kilometers from Kirveskoski to Järvenpää, 15 kilometers to Sipoo's administrative center Nikkilä, 24 kilometers to Porvoo, 17 kilometers to Askola and 22 kilometers to Mäntsälä. From the northern part of Kirveskoski, regional road 146 runs west to Järvenpää and regional road 151 east to Askola's village Monninkylä, while there is a connecting road 1494, which extends south to Nikkilä and north to the national road 25 between Hanko ja Mäntsälä.

Kirveskoski is home to the stone church of Pornainen, which was built in 1924 and designed by architect Ilmari Launis. In addition, there are two grocery stores in the urban area, K-Market and Sale, the bank office of Itä-Uusimaa Osuuspankki, a comprehensive school, a local museum, a library, a retirement home, a fire station, a restaurant Pizza Burger House and an SEO and St1 filling stations. In the southern part of the village is Lake Kotojärvi, which is the largest of the municipal lakes, and next to it is Laukkoski village.

The most famous businessman of Kirveskoski was Aleksi Nyman, also known as "the Emperor of Rectified spirit", who got rich by smuggling illegal alcohol from Estonia when the Finnish prohibition law began in 1919. He even got caught with other smugglers and was imprisoned. At the end of the prohibition law in 1932, Nyman lived in Kirveskoski and began practicing as a butcher.

See also 
 Mäntsälä (village)
 Numminen, Mäntsälä

References

External links 
 Pornainen-seura ry
 Kylät ja nähtävyydet - Pornaisten kunta

Southern Finland Province
Uusimaa
Villages in Finland